David Feliksovich Shavlokhov (born 24 February 1998) is a Russian football player who plays for FC Alania Vladikavkaz.

Club career
He made his debut in the Russian Football National League for FC Alania Vladikavkaz on 1 August 2020 in a game against FC SKA-Khabarovsk, as a starter.

References

External links
 
 Profile by Russian Football National League
 

1998 births
Living people
Russian footballers
Association football defenders
FC Spartak Vladikavkaz players
Russian First League players
Russian Second League players